Glaichbea is a small hamlet in the Highland council area, located directly south of Camault Muir in the Highlands of Scotland. It is part of the civil parish of Kiltarlity and Convinth, and the lieutenancy area and historic county of Inverness-shire.

Populated places in Inverness committee area